A plaint note is a legal document, chiefly referred to as such under English law and that of other Commonwealth nations. It is sent by a court to a defendant to confirm legal action taken against them, and to inform them of their case number. In this way, it is comparable to a summons in American law.

Legal documents